Gachineh may refer to:
 Gachineh-ye Bala, Hormozgan Province
 Gachineh-ye Pain, Hormozgan Province
 Gachineh, Lorestan